Oikarinen is a Finnish surname. Notable people with the surname include:

 Toivo Oikarinen (born 1924), Finnish cross country skier
 Jarkko Oikarinen (born 1967), Finnish computer scientist
 Ossi Oikarinen (born 1970), Finnish engineer

Finnish-language surnames